Stenopterus rufus is a beetle species of round-necked longhorns belonging to the family Cerambycidae, subfamily Cerambycinae.

Subspecies and varietas
Subspecies and varietas include:
 Stenopterus rufus rufus (Linnaeus, 1767)
Stenopterus rufus rufus var. caubeti Podaný, 1957
Stenopterus rufus rufus var. cavalairensis Jurecek
Stenopterus rufus rufus var. geniculatus Kraatz, 1863
Stenopterus rufus rufus var. meridionalis Ragusa
Stenopterus rufus rufus var. nigricornis Depoli, 1926
Stenopterus rufus rufus var. nigrolineatus Plavilstshikov
 Stenopterus rufus syriacus Pic, 1903
 Stenopterus rufus transcaspicus Plavilstshikov, 1940

Description

The body has a velvet-like hair. Elytra are very narrow. Antennae are about as long as the body and clearly segmented. The head and pronotum are black colored and the abdomen has a black background color horizontally crossed by yellow stripes. The first two segments of their antennae are black, the color of the following ones is variable but generally yellow with items III to V black at the apex, but sometimes items III to XI are entirely yellow or entirely black. Elytra are red with black base and apex. The legs are mainly red.

Biology
Larvae are polyphagous wood borers in dead branches of deciduous trees (Quercus, Castanea, Robinia, Juglans, Prunus, Salix, Pistacia, Corylus avellana, Ostrya carpinifolia, Paliurus spina-christi etc.).

The adults can be encountered from May through August, completing their life cycle in two years. They are very common flower-visitors, especially Apiaceae species, Heracleum sphondylium and Ranunculus repens, feeding on pollen and the nectar.

Distribution
This beetle is widespread in most of Europe, in Caucasus, Transcaucasia, Iran and in the Near East (Albania, Armenia, Austria, Belgium, Bosnia and Herzegovina, Bulgaria, Corsica, Croatia, Czech Republic, France, Germany, Greece, Hungary, Iran, Israel, Italy, Jordan, Luxembourg, Malta, Moldova, Poland, Romania, Russia, Sardinia, Serbia, Sicily, Slovakia, Slovenia, Spain, Switzerland, Syria, Turkey, Turkmenistan, Ukraine).

Habitat
These beetles mainly inhabit meadows, hedge rows, beech forests and wet forests.

Gallery

References

External links

 Nederlands Soortenregister
 INPN
 Arthropods

Stenopterini
Beetles of Europe
Beetles described in 1767
Taxa named by Carl Linnaeus